The Taylor Bird is a homebuilt aircraft that was designed by C. G. Taylor, the designer of the Taylor Cub.

Design and development
The part-built Taylor Bird was presented at the 1977 EAA airshow. The aircraft is a tandem seat, mid-wing pusher configuration design, with conventional landing gear. The fuselage is built with aluminum stressed skin. The aircraft features a unique entryway, mounting the entire nose and windshield on sliding rails that moves forward, allowing access to the cabin. The wingtips are slotted and wings are foldable. The engine features a custom propeller speed reduction unit that remained in limited production after Taylor production ceased. The prototype first flew on July 17, 1979.

Specifications (Taylor Bird)

See also

References

Homebuilt aircraft